The 2022 Vermont lieutenant gubernatorial election was held on November 8, 2022, to elect the lieutenant governor of the state of Vermont. The election coincided with various other federal and state elections, including for Governor of Vermont. Primary elections were held on August 9. Vermont is one of 21 states that elects its lieutenant governor separately from its governor.

Incumbent Democratic lieutenant governor Molly Gray retired to run for the U.S. House of Representatives. She was first elected in 2020, defeating Republican businessman Scott Milne with 51.3% of the vote. Former lieutenant governor David Zuckerman won the election as the Progressive candidate, defeating his Republican opponent Joe Benning. David Zuckerman became the first Vermont Progressive Lieutenant Governor in Vermont's history and the first person elected to a statewide office without a formal designation as a Democrat or Republican since 2004.

Democratic primary

Candidates

Nominee
David Zuckerman, former lieutenant governor and nominee for Governor of Vermont in 2020

Eliminated in primary
Charlie Kimbell, state representative
Patricia Preston, President & CEO of Vermont Council on World Affairs
Kitty Toll, University of Vermont trustee and former state representative

Declined
T.J. Donovan, former Vermont Attorney General
Steffen Gillom, president of the Windham County NAACP
Molly Gray, incumbent lieutenant governor (ran for U.S. House)
Debbie Ingram, former state senator and candidate for lieutenant governor in 2020
Doug Racine, former lieutenant governor, nominee for Governor of Vermont in 2002, and candidate in 2010
Kesha Ram, state senator and candidate for lieutenant governor in 2016 (running for U.S. House)
Brenda Siegel, nonprofit executive, candidate for Governor of Vermont in 2018, and candidate for lieutenant governor in 2020 (running for governor)
Shap Smith, former Speaker of the Vermont House of Representatives and candidate for lieutenant governor in 2016

Endorsements

Polling

Results

Republican primary

Candidates

Nominee
Joe Benning, state senator and former minority leader of the Vermont Senate

Eliminated in primary
Gregory Thayer, accountant, former Rutland city councillor, and former chair of the Rutland Republican Party

Declined
Corey Parent, state senator

Polling

Results

Progressive primary

Candidates

Declared
David Zuckerman, former lieutenant governor and nominee for Governor of Vermont in 2020 (write-in, endorsed by state party)

Withdrew
Cindy Weed, former state representative (running for state house)

Results

Other parties

Candidates

Declared 
 Ian G. Diamondstone (Green Mountain)

General election

Endorsements

Polling

Results

Notes

References 

lieutenant gubernatorial
Vermont
Vermont lieutenant gubernatorial elections